Saint-Hubert Airfield  is a public use airfield located near Saint-Hubert, Belgium, Luxembourg, Wallonia, Belgium.

It has four grass runways, in two parallel pairs, almost perpendicular; several aircraft hangars are rented on the site. It is located in the heart of the Ardennes, in uncontrolled airspace.

History
Initially created as an aviation school in 1930, the airfield was used as a US Army center in 1945. It was sold to the Belgian state in 1946 and served as a backup airport for the city of Ostend, in case Melsbroek or Brussels Airport were to be unusable. It has a long tradition in glider flying.

See also
List of airports in Belgium

References

External links 
 Airport record for Saint Hubert Airport at Landings.com

Airports in Luxembourg (Belgium)
Airports established in 1930
Saint-Hubert, Belgium